Flan cake, also known as leche flan cake or crème caramel cake, is a Filipino chiffon or sponge cake (mamón) baked with a layer of leche flan (crème caramel) on top and drizzled with caramel syrup. It is sometimes known as "custard cake", which confuses it with yema cake. Modern versions of flan cake can be cooked with a variety of added ingredients. An example is the use of ube cake as the base.

A similar Filipino dessert that uses a steamed cupcake (puto mamón) as the base is known as puto flan. Flan cake is very similar to the Puerto Rican dish flancocho, except the latter includes cream cheese.

See also
Yema cake
Mango cake
Buko pandan cake
Buko pie

References

Philippine desserts
Steamed foods
Sponge cakes